SpVgg 07 Elversberg is a German association football club, located in Spiesen-Elversberg, Saarland.

History

The club was founded in 1907 as FC Germania Elversberg. It was dissolved in 1914, but then re-constituted in 1918 as Sportvereinigung VfB Elversberg, spending a season in the tier-one Kreisliga Saar in 1921–22. After World War II a number of local associations came together to form Sportgemeinde Elversberg. The current club became independent of SG as SV Elversberg VfB 07 in 1952. From 1951 to 1960 SV played in the Amateurliga Saarland (III), but then disappeared into tier IV and V football until 1980 when they re-emerged in the Amateur Oberliga Südwest (III) for a span of seven seasons. After nearly another decade spent between the Verbandsliga Saarland (IV) and the Landesliga Saarland/Nordost (V) the club returned to tier III football in the Regionalliga West/Südwest.

Since 1998, SV Elversberg has played in the Regionalliga Süd (III) as a lower table side. For the 2008–09 season, the club belonged to the new Regionalliga West where it stayed until 2012 when it became part of the new Regionalliga Südwest. In 2012–13, the club finished runners-up in the new league and qualified for the promotion play-off to the 3. Liga where it overcame the reserve team of TSV 1860 München to earn promotion to this league.

SV Elversberg lasted for only one season in the 3. Liga, suffering relegation alongside fellow Saar side 1. FC Saarbrücken back to the Regionalliga. They finished runners-up in the Regionalliga Südwest in 2015–16 but lost to FSV Zwickau in the promotion play-off and had to remain in the league. The following season, they won the league but were denied promotion by SpVgg Unterhaching, who beat them 5–2 on aggregate in another promotion play-off. In the 2021–22 season, SV Elversberg finished first in the Regionalliga Südwest to promote to the 3. Liga.

Honours

League
 Regionalliga Südwest (IV)
Champions: 2017, 2022
 Runners-up: 2013, 2016
 Oberliga Südwest (IV)
 Champions: 1996, 1998
 Verbandsliga Saarland (IV)
 Champions: 1980, 1994, 2008 (reserve team)

Cup
 Saarland Cup
 Winners: 2009, 2010, 2015, 2018, 2020, 2021, 2022
 Runners-up: 1979, 1982, 2004, 2014, 2016, 2019

Recent managers

Recent managers of the club:

Recent seasons

The recent season-by-season performance of the club:

SV Elversberg

SV Elversberg II

 With the introduction of the Regionalligas in 1994 and the 3. Liga in 2008 as the new third tier, below the 2. Bundesliga, all leagues below dropped one tier.

Key

Current squad

References

External links

SV 07 Elversberg at Worldfootball.net
Das deutsche Fußball-Archiv historical German domestic league tables 

 
Football clubs in Germany
Football clubs in Saarland
Association football clubs established in 1907
1907 establishments in Germany
Neunkirchen (German district)
3. Liga clubs